Martin Ellingsen (born 4 May 1995) is a Norwegian professional footballer who plays as a midfielder for Eliteserien club Molde.

Club career

Kongsvinger
Ellingsen made his debut for Kongsvinger on 7 April 2013, in a 1. divisjon game Kongsvinger won 1–0 against Mjøndalen. On 1 May 2013, he scored his first goal for the club in the Norwegian Cup second round game against Raufoss. Ellingsen made 138 appearances for Kongsvinger and scored 21 goals in all competitions.

Molde
On 11 August 2017, Ellingsen joined Molde FK from Kongsvinger, having previously already agreed to join the club in December 2017. He signed a three-year contract with the club.

Ellingsen made his Molde debut on 20 August 2017 in an Eliteserien away game Molde lost 3–2 against Stabæk. On 17 September 2017, he scored his first goal for the club in Molde's 3–2 win against Viking. He got his debut in UEFA competitions on 18 July 2019 in Molde's 0–0 away draw against KR in the 2019–20 UEFA Europa League first qualifying round. On 27 November 2019, Molde announced that Ellingsen had agreed to a contract that will keep him at the club until the end of the 2022 season. In the 2020–21 UEFA Europa League he scored a goal against Arsenal in a group stage fixture.

Career statistics

Club

Honours
Molde
Eliteserien: 2019

References

1995 births
Living people
Norwegian footballers
Association football midfielders
Norwegian First Division players
Eliteserien players
Kongsvinger IL Toppfotball players
Molde FK players
People from Elverum
Sportspeople from Innlandet